Duncan Robertson was a Scotland international rugby football player.

Rugby Union career

Amateur career

Robertson played for Edinburgh Academicals.

Provincial career

Robertson played for Edinburgh District in the 1873–74 season.

International career

He was capped once for Scotland on 8 March 1875.

References

1907 deaths
1851 births
Scottish rugby union players
Scotland international rugby union players
Edinburgh Academicals rugby union players
Edinburgh District (rugby union) players
Rugby union forwards